Fiendish Regression is the sixth album by Swedish death metal band Grave. It was released on August 23, 2004 through Century Media Records.

Track listing

Personnel
Grave
Pelle Ekegren - Drums
Jonas Torndal - Guitars
Ola Lindgren - Vocals, Guitars
Fredrik Isaksson - Bass

Production
Olle Carlsson - Photography (band)
Jacek Wiśniewski - Cover art
Tommy Tägtgren - Recording, Mixing, Producer
Peter Tägtgren - Producer
Henrik Jonsson - Mastering
Ola Lindgren - Recording, Mixing, Lyrics
Stefan Wibbeke - Layout, Design

References

2004 albums
Grave (band) albums
Century Media Records albums
Albums produced by Peter Tägtgren